Sheezan Mohammed Khan (born 9 September 1994) is an Indian television actor. He is best known as young Akbar/Sultan Murad Mirza in Jodha Akbar and as Ali Baba in Ali Baba: Dastaan-E-Kabul.

Early life
Khan was born on 9 September 1994 and brought up in Mumbai. He graduated from the University of Mumbai. He has two older sisters, Falaq Naaz and Shafaq Naaz, both of whom are television actresses. He is a fitness enthusiast and pet lover. Khan is a frequent speaker at TEDx.

Career
Khan started his acting career, in 2013, with the historical drama Jodha Akbar. 

In 2016, he portrayed Vinay Saxena in Silsila Pyaar Ka opposite Sheen Dass. He then appeared as Prince Kartikay/Yuvraj Bhoj in the historical drama Chandra Nandini in 2017 and Prithvi Vallabh - Itihaas Bhi, Rahasya Bhi in 2018. 

In 2019, he appeared as Raghav in Ek Thi Rani Ek Tha Raavan, and in the same year he played Arjun Priya in Tara From Satara.

In February 2020, he joined Nazar 2 opposite Shruti Sharma. Sheezan stated his brother was his inspiration behind portraying Apurva in Nazar 2. Amid Lockdown and pandemic situation of COVID-19, despite having good ratings Nazar 2 went off-air. In 2021, he was seen as Aarya in Pavitra: Bharose Ka Safar.

He was last seen in the lead role of Ali Baba opposite Tunisha Sharma in Sab TV show Ali Baba: Dastaan-E-Kabul.

Personal life 
He previously dated actress Mrinal Singh from Kundali Bhagya.

On 24 December 2022, Khan's co-star Tunisha Sharma committed suicide by hanging herself in his make-up room on the set of the television serial Ali Baba: Dastaan-E-Kabul. Sheezan was arrested after Sharma's mother filed a charge of abetment against him. On 5 March 2023, Khan was released on bail after 70 days in jail.

Filmography

Television

See also 
 List of Indian television actors

References

External links
 
 

1994 births
Living people
21st-century Indian male actors